Staromryasovo (İśke Meräś) is a rural locality (a selo) in Imay-Karmalinsky Selsoviet, Davlekanovsky District, Bashkortostan, Russia. The population was 259 as of 2010. There is 1 street.

Geography 
Staromryasovo is located 40 km east of Davlekanovo (the district's administrative centre) by road. Novomryasovo is the nearest rural locality.

References 

Rural localities in Davlekanovsky District